Nathaniel Wyche (1607 – 23 May 1659) was a British merchant and president of the English East India Company.

Early life
Nathaniel was born in 1607 and baptized at Mitcham on 5 August 1607. He was the youngest son of Elizabeth ( Saltonstall) Wyche and Richard Wyche, a director of the East India Company. One of his elder brothers was Sir Peter Wyche (1554–1621), the British ambassador to the Ottoman Empire (who was knighted by King Charles I in 1626), and his maternal grandfather was Lord Mayor of London Richard Saltonstall. His mother's first cousin, Sir Richard Saltonstall, established a settlement in the Massachusetts Bay Colony in 1630.

Career
A long-time member of the English East India Company, Wyche served in India, including at Masulipatam, from 1627 to 1636 and had been one of the Committees of the United Joint Stock from 1650 to 1654.  He was selected as the Company's president in 1658, though he initially turned down the position. He was the first company president of the whole of India, which had previously been divided into four presidencies.

Personal life
In 1657, Wyche was married to Anne ( Cranmer) Slane, who was 26 years his junior, but they had no children. Anne, a widow, was the youngest child of Susanna ( Powell) Cramner and William Cramner, a merchant adventurer of Rotterdam.

He died at Surat on 23 May 1659 and was buried in the English Cemetery there. After his death, his widow married Sir John Cloberry, MP for Winchester, a younger son of the Cloberrys of Broadstone in Devon. Together, they had "seven children, of whom only four daughters lived to be married."

References

 1607 births
 1659 deaths
17th-century English businesspeople
British East India Company people